Alexander Abu Abedi is a Ghanaian politician and was a member of the first parliament of the second Republic of Ghana. He represented the Akropong constituency under the membership of the Progress Party.

Early life and education 
Alexander was born on 12 September 1930 in the Eastern region of Ghana. He attended Abetifi Presbyterian College of Education, Abetifi-Kwahu formerly Abetifi Presbyterian Boys' Boarding School where he obtained his Teachers' Training Certificate. He worked as an advertiser before going into parliament.

Politics 
Alexander began his political career in 1969 when he became the parliamentary candidate for the Progress Party (PP) to represent Akropong constituency prior to the commencement of the 1969 Ghanaian parliamentary election. He assumed office as a member of the first parliament of the second Republic of Ghana on 1 October 1969 after being pronounced winner at the 1969 Ghanaian parliamentary election and was later suspended following the overthrow of the Busia government on 13 January 1972.

Personal life 
He is a Christian.

References 

1930 births
Progress Party (Ghana) politicians
Ghanaian MPs 1969–1972
People from Eastern Region (Ghana)
Presbyterian College of Education, Akropong alumni
Living people